Moravská Nová Ves (until 1911 Nová Ves) is a market town in Břeclav District in the South Moravian Region of the Czech Republic. It has about 2,600 inhabitants.

History
The first written mention of Moravská Nová Ves is from 1265. The settlement was founded shortly before by the Cistercian monastery in Velehrad.

Moravská Nová Ves was heavily damaged by the 2021 South Moravia tornado.

References

External links

Market towns in the Czech Republic
Populated places in Břeclav District
Moravian Slovakia